Brewster's Millions is a 1902 comedic novel by George Barr McCutcheon.

Brewster's Millions may also refer to:
Brewster's Millions (play), a 1906 Broadway production by Winchell Smith and Byron Ongley
Brewster's Millions (1914 film), directed by Cecil B. DeMille and Oscar Apfel
Brewster's Millions (1921 film), starring Roscoe Fatty Arbuckle
Miss Brewster's Millions, a 1926 film starring Bebe Daniels
Brewster's Millions (1935 film), starring Jack Buchanan
Brewster's Millions (1945 film), starring Dennis O'Keefe
Three on a Spree, a 1961 film starring Jack Watling
Brewster's Millions (1985 film), starring Richard Pryor
Arunachalam, a 1995 film starring Rajinikanth